The Battle of Manacaud took place at Manacaud near Thiruvananthapuram in 1680 between the forces of the Kingdom of Venad and the Mughal Empire.

Prelude 
The Kingdom of Venad was going through a political turmoil. Dissensions broke out between the reigning queen Umayamma and the feudatory chiefs called Ettuveetil Pillamar. Taking advantage of this state of affairs in Venad, a commander under the Mughal Emperor Aurangazeb, wandering in the southern part of the peninsular India, with a number of horsemen, invaded the unprotected southern part of Venad. Mughal commander's forces reached Thiruvananthapuram without facing any resistance at all and encamped at Manacaud.

Umayamma Rani, finding it difficult to recover her kingdom from the Mughal warlord while her feudatories were animated by a spirit of disloyalty towards her government, invited her relative Kerala Varma of the Kingdom of Kottayam to raise an army.

The battle 
Kerala Varma raised a force armed with bows and arrows, slings, swords and lances. He personally led the army against the Mughal forces and attacked them unexpectedly at Manacaud. As the Mughals didn't have a sufficient force, all their horse men having been scattered about between Varkala and Thovalai collecting the revenue, they were unable to make a stand and was obliged to retreat precipitately to Thovalai. Kerala Varma pursued him and the Mughal commander was reinforced by a party of horsemen from Thovalai and the other southern regions. He made a stand near the side of a hill at Thiruvattar, and a severe battle ensued. While the jungles, and rocks with which the locality was covered, presented insuperable obstacles to the Mughul commander's cavalry and threw it into confusion. Archers and slingers continued their attack on the Mughals. While the conflict was going on, many of the horsemen were killed and, a nest of wasps, on one of the trees under which the commander was fighting on horseback, was disturbed by the throwing of a stone from one of the slings and the insects came down in swarms, and stung the Mughal commander on his face. The commander fell down. The fallen chief was soon killed by the  archers and his army was thus defeated. Kerala Varma succeeded in securing around three hundred horses and about a hundred prisoners with many swords, lances and other weapons from the defeated army.

Aftermath 
Venad regained the lands occupied by the Mughal chieftain. Kerala Varma organised a battalion of cavalry with the captured horses and brought all the rebellious feudatories under his control. He then acted as the queen's principal counsellor and commander of the troops of Venad. Umayamma Rani elevated him to the position of heir apparent. Subsequently, misunderstandings arose between her and the heir apparent and it is believed that he was assassinated.

See also

 Mukilan's Invasion of Venad
 Cotiote War

References 

 History of Travancore from the Earliest Times, pp 104–105, P. Shungoonny Menon (1878)

Manacaud
1680 in military history
1680 in India
Manacaud